The Lotus 48 was a Formula 2 racing car designed by Colin Chapman and Maurice Phillippe and powered by a  Cosworth FVA engine. It won three races in the hands of Jim Clark but was generally uncompetitive against rival machinery. Ultimately, its main claim to fame (or notoriety) is as the car in which Clark was killed at Hockenheim on 7 April 1968.

Development
The Lotus 48 was designed to take the Cosworth FVA engine to compete under the new Formula Two regulations introduced in 1967. It had a full monocoque chassis with a tubular spaceframe for the engine, inboard coil springs operated by rocker arms at the front and reversed wishbones with twin trailing and top links at the rear. The FVA engine was mated to a ZF gearbox. Only four examples were built; although it was intended as a customer car, prospective customers flocked to buy the more successful Brabham BT23 instead.

Racing history
Graham Hill persuaded Colin Chapman to take the new car to the 1967 Australian Grand Prix, where it ran as high as third before succumbing to gearbox failure. Thereafter it was run by Team Lotus in the 1967 Formula Two season, driven by Hill and Jim Clark, and occasionally by Jackie Oliver. Clark scored three wins, and several poles and fastest laps between him and Hill. Oliver drove the car in the 1967 German Grand Prix which was run for Formula One and Formula Two cars; he finished first of the Formula Two entries and fifth overall.

Hill and Clark drove the 48 again in 1968 but Clark was killed in the Deutschland Trophäe race at Hockenheim. Jackie Oliver then joined Hill as full-time team member, but neither scored any wins, Oliver's best result being second at the Rhein-Pokalrennen and Hill placing fourth at the Reims Grand Prix.

At the end of 1968 the cars were sold to Gerry Kinnane's Team Ireland. Jackie Oliver drove one in the Argentine Temporada series, and then for 1969 the cars made sporadic appearances in the hands of John Watson and John Pollock, with little success.

Complete Formula One World Championship results
(key)

 No points scored by the Lotus 48 as it was run in a Formula Two Category.

References

48
Formula Two cars
Tasman Series cars